The GDNF family receptor-α (GFRα) proteins are a group of co-receptors which form complexes with GDNF-family ligands (GFLs) to activate RET, the receptor of the GFLs. The GFRα co-receptors include the following:

 GFRα1 – preference for GDNF
 GFRα2 – preference for neurturin
 GFRα3 – preference for artemin
 GFRα4 – preference for persephin
 GFRAL - receptor for GDF15

References

TGFβ domain
Proteins